Andreas Christodoulou (alternate spelling: Antreas) (born February 22, 1995) is a Cypriot Greek professional basketball player for AEK Larnacas  of the Cypriot League. He is a 1.97 m (6 ft 5" in) tall swingman. He can also play at the point guard position, if needed.

Professional career
Christodoulou played with the youth clubs of AEL Limassol and APOEL in Cyprus, before moving to Greece, where he played in the Greek minors with Mantoulidis. 

He began his pro career after signing a five-year contract with the EuroLeague champions at the time, Olympiacos, in 2013. With Olympiacos, he won the FIBA Intercontinental Cup in 2013 and the Greek Basket League championship in 2015.

He was loaned to Koroivos for the 2015–16 season. On July 21, 2016, Christodoulou signed a two-year contract with the Rethymno Cretan Kings.

After a fruitful four-year stint with Rethymno, Christodoulou signed with EuroCup side Promitheas on July 20, 2020. 

On July 14, 2021, Christodoulou moved to Thessaloniki, signing with PAOK. In 21 games, he averaged 4.4 points, 1.5 rebounds and 0.8 assists, playing around 14 minutes per contest. 

On June 20, 2022, Christodoulou returned to Cyprus, signing a three-year deal with AEK Larnacas.

National team career
Christodoulou has been a member of the junior national teams of Cyprus and Greece. With Greece's junior national team, he played at the 2014 FIBA Europe Under-20 Championship, and the 2015 FIBA Europe Under-20 Championship.

Domestic leagues

Awards and accomplishments
FIBA Intercontinental Cup Champion: (2013)
Greek League Champion: (2015)
Greek Super Cup Champion: (2020)

References

External links
 Andreas Christodoulou at archive.fiba.com 
 Andreas Christodoulou at euroleague.net
 Andreas Christodoulou at esake.baskethotel.com
 Andreas Christodoulou at esake.gr 
 Andreas Christodoulou at eurobasket.com
 Andreas Christodoulou at draftexpress.com
 Andreas Christodoulou at scoresway.com

1995 births
Living people
Cypriot men's basketball players
Greek men's basketball players
Koroivos B.C. players
Olympiacos B.C. players
P.A.O.K. BC players
Promitheas Patras B.C. players
Rethymno B.C. players
Shooting guards
Small forwards
Sportspeople from Limassol